The 1993 IGA Tennis Classic was a women's tennis tournament played on indoor hard courts at The Greens Country Club in Oklahoma City, Oklahoma in the United States that was part of Tier III of the 1993 WTA Tour. It was the eighth edition of the tournament was held from February 15 through February 21, 1993. Third-seeded Zina Garrison-Jackson won the singles title and earned $27,000 first-prize money.

Finals

Singles
 Zina Garrison-Jackson defeated  Patty Fendick 6–2, 6–2
 It was Garrison-Jackson's 1st singles title of the year and the 12th of her career.

Doubles
 Patty Fendick /  Zina Garrison-Jackson defeated  Katrina Adams /  Manon Bollegraf 6–3, 6–2

References

External links
 ITF tournament edition details
 Tournament draws

IGA Classic
U.S. National Indoor Championships
IGA Tennis Classic
IGA Tennis Classic
IGA Tennis Classic